The transverse acetabular ligament (transverse ligament or Tunstall’s ligament) is a portion of the acetabular labrum, though differing from it in having no cartilage cells among its fibers.

It consists of strong, flattened fibers, which cross the acetabular notch, and convert it into a foramen through which the nutrient vessels enter the joint. It is an intra-articular structure of the hip.

Function 
The transverse acetabular ligament prevents inferior displacement of head of femur.

Additional Images

References

External links
 

Ligaments of the lower limb